The Complete Riverside Recordings is a box set of American jazz guitarist Wes Montgomery's early recordings on the Riverside label. It is a twelve-CD box set and was released in 1992. It contains 157 songs and includes 15 previously unissued performances, six re-edited versions of previously issued numbers and 29 alternate takes. The extensive liner notes by producer Orrin Keepnews and Jim Ferguson, session notes, and photographs. Keepnews and Ferguson received a Grammy Award nomination for Best Album Notes.

The collection covers Montgomery's recordings from 1959 until late 1963 before he moved to the Verve label. The recordings made during this period are considered by fans and jazz historians to be his best and most influential. It includes recordings with his siblings Monk and Buddy, Tommy Flanagan, Nat and Cannonball Adderley, Milt Jackson, George Shearing, Johnny Griffin and many others.

Reception 

In his Allmusic review, critic Scott Yanow stated, "All in all, there is a tremendous amount of rewarding performances included in this essential set, most of which show why Wes Montgomery is still considered one of the all-time great jazz guitarists."

Writing for the Los Angeles Times, Zan Stewart praised the box-set, writing "Time has done little to diminish the elegant charm that Montgomery offered in his ardently swinging improvisations. On a ballad such as "Born to be Blue," he could be relaxed and luxuriant. For a blues, he was straightforward and melodic, never opting for funk cliches, while on the up tempos he displayed a rippling muscularity... a must-have for the jazz guitar enthusiast."

Personnel
 Wes Montgomery – guitar
Cannonball Adderley – alto saxophone
Nat Adderley – cornet
Ray Barretto – conga
George Brown – drums
Bobby Thomas – drums
Jimmy Cobb – drums
 Louis Hayes – drums
Lex Humphries – drums
Albert "Tootie" Heath – drums
Walter Perkins – drums
Osie Johnson – drums
Ricardo Chimelis – bongos, timbales
Paul Parker – drums
Armando Peraza – conga
Ray Brown – bass
Ron Carter – bass
Paul Chambers – bass
Milt Hinton – bass
Percy Heath – bass
Monk Montgomery – bass
 Sam Jones – bass
Kenny Burrell – guitar 
James Clay – flute, tenor sax
Victor Feldman – piano, vibraphone
George Shearing – piano
Bobby Timmons – piano
Tommy Flanagan – piano
Buddy Montgomery – piano
Wynton Kelly – piano
Barry Harris – piano
Dick Hyman – piano, celeste  
Milt Jackson – vibraphone
Hank Jones – piano, celeste
Melvin Rhyne – organ  
Joe Gordon – trumpet
Harold Land – tenor saxophone
Leo Kruczek – violin
Harry Lookofsky – violin 
David Nadien – violin
Gene Orloff – violin
Raoul Poliakin – violin
Samuel Rand – violin
Sylvan Shulman – violin
Mac Ceppos – violin
Winston Collymore – violin
Arnold Eidus – violin
Paul Winter – violin
Isadore Zir – violin
Burt Fisch – viola
Ralph Hersh – viola
Alfred Brown – viola
George Ricci – cello
Kermit Moore – cello
Lucien Schmit – cello
Charles McCracken – cello player
Gloria Agostini – harp
Margaret Rose – harp
Phil Bodner – woodwind
Production notes:
 Orrin Keepnews – producer, liner notes
 Jim Ferguson – liner notes
Jimmy Jones – arranger, conductor

References

Complete Riverside Recordings
Albums produced by Orrin Keepnews
1992 compilation albums
Riverside Records compilation albums